Ahmed Rifaat is the presiding judge of the Trials of Hosni, Alaa and Gamal Mubarak following the 2011 Egyptian revolution.

References

21st-century Egyptian judges
People of the Egyptian revolution of 2011
Living people
Year of birth missing (living people)